Gudrun Elisabeth Berglund (born 26 May 1949) is a retired Swedish swimmer who won a bronze medal at the 1970 European Aquatics Championships. She competed in three freestyle events at the 1968 Summer Olympics, but was eliminated in preliminaries.

Berglund was born in Timrå and started swimming in a club in 1960–1961; she later moved to Ytterhogdal. After retirement from swimming she worked as a gym coach and teacher of Swedish to foreigners. She is a board member of the Swedish Ski Association.

References

External links
Elisabeth Berglund. Sveriges Olympiska Kommitté

1949 births
Swimmers at the 1968 Summer Olympics
Swedish female freestyle swimmers
Living people
Olympic swimmers of Sweden
European Aquatics Championships medalists in swimming